

Peerage of England

|rowspan="2"|Duke of Cornwall (1337)||none||1422||1453||
|-
|Edward of Westminster||1453||1471||
|-
|Duke of York (1385)||Richard of York, 3rd Duke of York||1426||1460||
|-
|Duke of Norfolk (1397)||John de Mowbray, 3rd Duke of Norfolk||1432||1461||
|-
|Duke of Exeter (1443)||Henry Holland, 3rd Duke of Exeter||1447||1461||
|-
|Duke of Buckingham (1444)||Humphrey Stafford, 1st Duke of Buckingham||1444||1460||
|-
|rowspan="2"|Duke of Somerset (1448)||Edmund Beaufort, 1st Duke of Somerset||1448||1455||Died
|-
|Henry Beaufort, 2nd Duke of Somerset||1455||1464||
|-
|rowspan="2"|Duke of Suffolk (1448)||William de la Pole, 1st Duke of Suffolk||1448||1450||Died; titles considered forfeited
|-
|John de la Pole, 2nd Duke of Suffolk||1450||1463||Title recognized in 1463
|-
|Earl of Warwick (1088)||Anne Neville, 16th Countess of Warwick and Richard Neville, 16th Earl of Warwick||14481449||14921471||
|-
|Earl of Arundel (1138)||William FitzAlan, 16th Earl of Arundel||1438||1487||
|-
|Earl of Oxford (1142)||John de Vere, 12th Earl of Oxford||1417||1462||
|-
|rowspan="2"|Earl of Devon (1335)||Thomas de Courtenay, 5th Earl of Devon||1422||1458||Died
|-
|Thomas Courtenay, 6th Earl of Devon||1458||1461||
|-
|Earl of Salisbury (1337)||Alice Montacute, 5th Countess of Salisbury and Richard Neville, 5th Earl of Salisbury||14281442||14621460||
|-
|Earl of Westmorland (1397)||Ralph Neville, 2nd Earl of Westmorland||1425||1484||
|-
|rowspan="2"|Earl of Northumberland (1416)||Henry Percy, 2nd Earl of Northumberland||1416||1455||
|-
|Henry Percy, 3rd Earl of Northumberland||1455||1461||
|-
|rowspan="2"|Earl of Shrewsbury (1442)||John Talbot, 1st Earl of Shrewsbury||1442||1453||Died
|-
|John Talbot, 2nd Earl of Shrewsbury||1453||1460||
|-
|Earl of Kendal (1446)||John de Foix, 1st Earl of Kendal||1446||1462||
|-
|Earl of Wiltshire (1449)||James Butler, 1st Earl of Wiltshire||1449||1461||
|-
|Earl of Worcester (1449)||John Tiptoft, 1st Earl of Worcester||1449||1470||
|-
|Earl of Surrey (1451)||John de Mowbray, 1st Earl of Surrey||1451||1476||New creation
|-
|rowspan="2"|Earl of Richmond (1452)||Edmund Tudor, 1st Earl of Richmond||1452||1456||New creation; died
|-
|Henry Tudor, Earl of Richmond||1456||1485||
|-
|Earl of Pembroke (1452)||Jasper Tudor, 1st Earl of Pembroke||1452||1461||New creation
|-
|Viscount Beaumont (1440)||John Beaumont, 1st Viscount Beaumont||1440||1460||
|-
|Viscount Bourchier (1446)||Henry Bourchier, 1st Viscount Bourchier||1446||1483||
|-
|rowspan="2"|Viscount Lisle (1451)||John Talbot, 1st Viscount Lisle||1451||1453||New creation; died
|-
|Thomas Talbot, 2nd Viscount Lisle||1453||1470||
|-
|Baron de Ros (1264)||Thomas de Ros, 9th Baron de Ros||1421||1464||
|-
|Baron Fauconberg (1295)||Joan Neville, 6th Baroness Fauconberg||1429||1490||
|-
|Baron FitzWalter (1295)||Elizabeth Radcliffe, suo jure Baroness FitzWalter||1431||1485||
|-
|Baron FitzWarine (1295)||Thomazine FitzWarine, suo jure Baroness FitzWarine||1433||1471||
|-
|Baron Grey de Wilton (1295)||Reginald Grey, 7th Baron Grey de Wilton||1442||1493||
|-
|Baron Clinton (1299)||John de Clinton, 5th Baron Clinton||1431||1464||
|-
|rowspan="2"|Baron De La Warr (1299)||Reginald West, 6th Baron De La Warr||1427||1450||Died
|-
|Richard West, 7th Baron De La Warr||1450||1476||
|-
|rowspan="2"|Baron Ferrers of Chartley (1299)||William de Ferrers, 7th Baron Ferrers of Chartley||1435||1450||Died
|-
|Anne Ferrers, 8th Baroness Ferrers of Chartley||1450||1468||
|-
|rowspan="2"|Baron Lovel (1299)||William Lovel, 7th Baron Lovel||1414||1455||Died
|-
|John Lovel, 8th Baron Lovel||1455||1465||
|-
|Baron Scales (1299)||Thomas de Scales, 7th Baron Scales||1419||1460||
|-
|Baron Welles (1299)||Lionel de Welles, 6th Baron Welles||1421||1461||
|-
|rowspan="2"|Baron de Clifford (1299)||Thomas Clifford, 8th Baron de Clifford||1422||1455||Died
|-
|John Clifford, 9th Baron de Clifford||1455||1461||
|-
|Baron Ferrers of Groby (1299)||Elizabeth Ferrers, 6th Baroness Ferrers of Groby||1445||1483||
|-
|Baron Morley (1299)||Alianore Lovel, 7th Baroness Morley||1442||1476||
|-
|Baron Strange of Knockyn (1299)||John le Strange, 8th Baron Strange||1449||1470||
|-
|Baron Zouche of Haryngworth (1308)||William la Zouche, 5th Baron Zouche||1415||1463||
|-
|rowspan="2"|Baron Audley of Heleigh (1313)||James Tuchet, 5th Baron Audley||1408||1459||Died
|-
|John Tuchet, 6th Baron Audley||1459||1490||
|-
|Baron Cobham of Kent (1313)||Edward Brooke, 6th Baron Cobham||1442||1464||
|-
|rowspan="2"|Baron Willoughby de Eresby (1313)||Robert Willoughby, 6th Baron Willoughby de Eresby||1409||1452||Died
|-
|Joan Willoughby, 7th Baroness Willoughby de Eresby||1452||1462||
|-
|rowspan="2"|Baron Dacre (1321)||Thomas Dacre, 6th Baron Dacre||1398||1458||Died
|-
|Joan Dacre, 7th Baroness Dacre||1458||1486||
|-
|rowspan="2"|Baron FitzHugh (1321)||William FitzHugh, 4th Baron FitzHugh||1425||1452||Died
|-
|Henry FitzHugh, 5th Baron FitzHugh||1452||1472||
|-
|Baron Greystock (1321)||Ralph de Greystock, 5th Baron Greystock||1436||1487||
|-
|Baron Grey of Ruthyn (1325)||Edmund Grey, 4th Baron Grey de Ruthyn||1441||1490||
|-
|rowspan="2"|Baron Harington (1326)||William Harington, 5th Baron Harington||1418||1458||Died
|-
|William Bonville, 6th Baron Harington||1458||1460||
|-
|Baron Poynings (1337)||Eleanor Percy, 6th Baroness Poynings||1446||1482||
|-
|rowspan="2"|Baron Scrope of Masham (1350)||John Scrope, 4th Baron Scrope of Masham||1426||1455||Died
|-
|Thomas Scrope, 5th Baron Scrope of Masham||1455||1475||
|-
|Baron Botreaux (1368)||William de Botreaux, 3rd Baron Botreaux||1392||1462||
|-
|rowspan="2"|Baron Scrope of Bolton (1371)||Henry Scrope, 4th Baron Scrope of Bolton||1420||1459||Died
|-
|John Scrope, 5th Baron Scrope of Bolton||1459||1498||
|-
|Baron Cromwell (1375)||Ralph de Cromwell, 3rd Baron Cromwell||1417||1455||Died, Barony fell into abeyance until 1490
|-
|Baron Bergavenny (1392)||George Nevill, 4th Baron Bergavenny||1447||1492||
|-
|Baron Grey of Codnor (1397)||Henry Grey, 4th Baron Grey of Codnor||1444||1496||
|-
|Baron Berkeley (1421)||James Berkeley, 1st Baron Berkeley||1421||1463||
|-
|rowspan="2"|Baron Hungerford (1426)||Robert Hungerford, 2nd Baron Hungerford||1449||1459||Died
|-
|Robert Hungerford, 3rd Baron Hungerford||1459||1461||
|-
|Baron Latimer (1432)||George Neville, 1st Baron Latimer||1432||1469||
|-
|Baron Dudley (1440)||John Sutton, 1st Baron Dudley||1440||1487||
|-
|Baron Sudeley (1441)||Ralph Boteler, 1st Baron Sudeley||1441||1473||
|-
|Baron Lisle (1444)||John Talbot, 1st Baron Lisle||1444||1453||Created Viscount Lisle in 1451, title held by his heir until 1475
|-
|Baron de Moleyns (1445)||Robert Hungerford, 1st Baron de Moleyns||1445||1461||Succeeded to the more senior Barony of Hungerford in 1459, see above
|-
|rowspan="2"|Baron Saye and Sele (1447)||James Fiennes, 1st Baron Saye and Sele||1447||1450||Died
|-
|William Fiennes, 2nd Baron Saye and Sele||1450||1471||
|-
|Baron Beauchamp of Powick (1447)||John Beauchamp, 1st Baron Beauchamp of Powick||1447||1475||
|-
|Baron Hoo and Hastings (1447)||Thomas Hoo, Baron Hoo and Hastings||1447||1455||Died, title extinct
|-
|Baron Rivers (1448)||Richard Woodville, 1st Baron Rivers||1448||1469||
|-
|Baron Stourton (1448)||John Stourton, 1st Baron Stourton||1448||1462||
|-
|Baron Vessy (1449)||Henry Bromflete, 1st Baron Vessy||1449||1469||
|-
|Baron Bonville (1449)||William Bonville, 1st Baron Bonville||1449||1461||
|-
|Baron Egremont (1449)||Thomas Percy, 1st Baron Egremont||1449||1460||
|-
|Baron Bergavenny (1450)||Edward Nevill, 1st Baron Bergavenny||1450||1476||New creation
|-
|Baron Richemount (1450)||Thomas Grey, 1st Baron Richemount||1450||1461||New creation
|-
|Baron Berners (1455)||John Bourchier, 1st Baron Berners||1455||1474||New creation
|-
|rowspan="2"|Baron Stanley (1456)||Thomas Stanley, 1st Baron Stanley||1456||1459||New creation, died
|-
|Thomas Stanley, 2nd Baron Stanley||1459||1504||
|-
|Baron Dacre of Gilsland (1459)||Randolph Dacre, 1st Baron Dacre||1459||1461||New creation
|-
|Baron Neville (1459)||John Neville, Baron Neville||1459||1461||New creation
|-
|}

Peerage of Scotland

|Duke of Rothesay (1398)||James Stewart, Duke of Rothesay||1452||1460||
|-
|Duke of Albany (1456)||Alexander Stewart, Duke of Albany||1456||1483||New creation
|-
|Earl of Dunbar (1115)||George II, Earl of March||1420||1457||
|-
|Earl of Lennox (1184)||Isabella, Countess of Lennox||1425||1458||Died, title extinct
|-
|Earl of Ross (1215)||John of Islay, Earl of Ross||1449||1476||
|-
|Earl of Sutherland (1235)||John de Moravia, 7th Earl of Sutherland||1427||1460||
|-
|rowspan=2|Earl of Douglas (1358)||William Douglas, 8th Earl of Douglas||1443||1452||Died
|-
|James Douglas, 9th Earl of Douglas||1452||1455||Attainted and his honours were forfeited
|-
|Earl of Moray (1372)||Elizabeth Dunbar, 8th Countess of Moray||1429||1455||Attainted, and the Earldom was forfeited
|-
|Earl of Orkney (1379)||William Sinclair, Earl of Orkney||1410||1476||
|-
|Earl of Angus (1389)||George Douglas, 4th Earl of Angus||1446||1463||
|-
|rowspan=2|Earl of Crawford (1398)||Alexander Lindsay, 4th Earl of Crawford||1446||1453||
|-
|David Lindsay, 5th Earl of Crawford||1453||1495||
|-
|Earl of Menteith (1427)||Malise Graham, 1st Earl of Menteith||1427||1490||
|-
|Earl of Huntly (1445)||Alexander Gordon, 1st Earl of Huntly||1445||1470||
|-
|Earl of Ormond (1445)||Hugh Douglas, Earl of Ormonde||1445||1455||Forfeited
|-
|Earl of Caithness (1452)||George Crichton, 1st Earl of Caithness||1452||1454||New creation; resigned the peerage
|-
|Earl of Erroll (1452)||William Hay, 1st Earl of Erroll||1452||1462||New creation
|-
|Earl of Caithness (1455)||William Sinclair, 1st Earl of Caithness||1455||1476||New creation
|-
|Earl of Argyll (1457)||Colin Campbell, 1st Earl of Argyll||1457||1493||New creation
|-
|Earl of Atholl (1457)||John Stewart, 1st Earl of Atholl||1457||1512||New creation
|-
|Earl of Morton (1458)||James Douglas, 1st Earl of Morton||1458||1493||New creation
|-
|Earl of Rothes (1458)||George Leslie, 1st Earl of Rothes||1458||1490||New creation
|-
|Earl Marischal (1458)||William Keith, 1st Earl Marischal||1458||1463||New creation
|-
|Earl of Mar and Garioch (1459)||John Stewart, Earl of Mar and Garioch||1459||1479||New creation
|-
|rowspan=2|Lord Erskine (1429)||Robert Erskine, 1st Lord Erskine||1429||1453||de jure Earl of Mar; died
|-
|Thomas Erskine, 2nd Lord Erskine||1453||1494||de jure Earl of Mar
|-
|Lord Hay (1429)||William Hay, 1st Lord Hay||1429||1462||Created Earl of Errol, see above
|-
|rowspan=2|Lord Somerville (1430)||William Somerville, 2nd Lord Somerville||1438||1456||Died
|-
|John Somerville, 3rd Lord Somerville||1456||1491||
|-
|Lord Lorne (1439)||John Stewart, 2nd Lord of Lorne||1449||1463||
|-
|rowspan=3|Lord Haliburton of Dirleton (1441)||John Haliburton, 2nd Lord Haliburton of Dirleton||1447||1454||Died
|-
|Patrick Haliburton, 3rd Lord Haliburton of Dirleton||1454||1459||Died
|-
|George Haliburton, 4th Lord Haliburton of Dirleton||1459||1492||
|-
|Lord Forbes (1442)||James Forbes, 2nd Lord Forbes||1448||1462||
|-
|rowspan=3|Lord Crichton (1443)||William Crichton, 1st Lord Crichton||1443||1454||Died
|-
|James Crichton, 2nd Lord Crichton||1454||1455||Died
|-
|William Crichton, 3rd Lord Crichton||1454||1484||
|-
|Lord Hamilton (1445)||James Hamilton, 1st Lord Hamilton||1445||1479||
|-
|rowspan=2|Lord Maxwell (1445)||Herbert Maxwell, 1st Lord Maxwell||1445||1454||Died
|-
|Robert Maxwell, 2nd Lord Maxwell||1454||1485||
|-
|rowspan=2|Lord Glamis (1445)||Patrick Lyon, 1st Lord Glamis||1445||1459||Died
|-
|Alexander Lyon, 2nd Lord Glamis||1459||1486||
|-
|Lord Graham (1445)||Patrick Graham, 1st Lord Graham||1445||1466||
|-
|Lord Leslie and Ballinbreich (1445)||George Leslie, 1st Lord Leslie and Ballinbreich||1445||1490||Created Earl of Rothes, see above
|-
|Lord Lindsay of the Byres (1445)||John Lindsay, 1st Lord Lindsay||1445||1482||
|-
|Lord Saltoun (1445)||Lawrence Abernethy, 1st Lord Saltoun||1445||1460||
|-
|rowspan=2|Lord Campbell (1445)||Duncan Campbell, 1st Lord Campbell||1445||1453||Died
|-
|Colin Campbell, 2nd Lord Campbell||1453||1493||Created Earl of Argyll in 1457, see above
|-
|Lord Gray (1445)||Andrew Gray, 1st Lord Gray||1445||1469||
|-
|Lord Montgomerie (1449)||Alexander Montgomerie, 1st Lord Montgomerie||1449||1470||
|-
|Lord Fleming (1451)||Robert Fleming, 1st Lord Fleming||1451||1494||New creation
|-
|Lord Seton (1451)||George Seton, 1st Lord Seton||1451||1478||New creation
|-
|Lord Borthwick (1452)||William Borthwick, 1st Lord Borthwick||1452||1470||New creation
|-
|Lord Boyd (1454)||Robert Boyd, 1st Lord Boyd||1454||1482||New creation
|-
|Lord Oliphant (1455)||Laurence Oliphant, 1st Lord Oliphant||1455||1498||New creation
|-
|Lord Kennedy (1457)||Gilbert Kennedy, 1st Lord Kennedy||1457||1489||New creation
|-
|Lord Livingston (1458)||James Livingston, 1st Lord Livingston||1458||1467||New creation
|-
|Lord Hailes (1458)||Patrick Hepburn, 1st Lord Hailes||1458||1483||New creation
|-
|Lord Avandale (1459)||Andrew Stewart, 1st Lord Avandale||1459||1488||New creation
|-
|}

Peerage of Ireland

|Earl of Ulster (1264)||Richard of York, 8th Earl of Ulster||1425||1460||
|-
|Earl of Kildare (1316)||Thomas FitzGerald, 7th Earl of Kildare||1434||1478||
|-
|rowspan=2|Earl of Ormond (1328)||James Butler, 4th Earl of Ormond||1405||1452||Died
|-
|James Butler, 5th Earl of Ormond||1452||1461||
|-
|Earl of Desmond (1329)||James FitzGerald, 6th Earl of Desmond||1420||1463||
|-
|rowspan=2|Earl of Waterford (1446)||John Talbot, 1st Earl of Waterford||1446||1453||Died
|-
|John Talbot, 2nd Earl of Waterford||1453||1460||
|-
|Baron Athenry (1172)||Thomas II de Bermingham||1428||1473||
|-
|Baron Kingsale (1223)||Patrick de Courcy, 11th Baron Kingsale||1430||1460||
|-
|Baron Kerry (1223)||Thomas Fitzmaurice, 8th Baron Kerry||1410||1469||
|-
|Baron Barry (1261)||William Barry, 8th Baron Barry||1420||1480||
|-
|rowspan=2|Baron Gormanston (1370)||Christopher Preston, 3rd Baron Gormanston||1422||1450||Died
|-
|Robert Preston, 4th Baron Gormanston||1450||1503||
|-
|rowspan=2|Baron Slane (1370)||Christopher Fleming, 4th Baron Slane||1446||1457||Died
|-
|David Fleming, 5th Baron Slane||1457||1463||
|-
|Baron Howth (1425)||Christopher St Lawrence, 2nd Baron Howth||1430||1465||
|-
|rowspan=2|Baron Killeen (1449)||Christopher Plunkett, 1st Baron Killeen||1449||1455||Died
|-
|Christopher Plunkett, 2nd Baron Killeen||1455||1462||
|-
|}

References

 

Lists of peers by decade
1450s in England
1450s in Ireland
15th century in England
15th century in Scotland
15th century in Ireland
15th-century English nobility
15th-century Scottish peers
15th-century Irish people
Peers